Jan Leitner (born 14 September 1953) is a retired long jumper who represented Czechoslovakia.

Leitner was born in Znojmo, Czechoslovakia. His greatest achievements were gold medals at the European Athletics Indoor Championships and IAAF World Indoor Championships in 1984 and 1985. He represented his country at the 1980 Summer Olympics and the 1983 World Championships in Athletics.

International competitions

References 
 
 

1953 births
Living people
People from Znojmo
Czech male long jumpers
Czechoslovak male long jumpers
Olympic athletes of Czechoslovakia
Athletes (track and field) at the 1980 Summer Olympics
European Athletics Championships medalists
World Athletics Championships athletes for Czechoslovakia
World Athletics Indoor Championships winners
Sportspeople from the South Moravian Region